Luis Mariano Delís Fournier (born December 6, 1957 in Guantánamo) is a retired Cuban athlete who competed in discus throw and shot put. Specializing in discus throw on the international scene, he won an Olympic bronze medal in 1980 as well as medals at the two first World Championships.

In 1990 he tested positive for banned substances and was disqualified from competition for two years. In light of the ban, Delís chose to retire from athletics. After retiring he became a coach, training 1992 Olympic champion Maritza Martén.

Achievements 
Discus throw unless noted.

1993 Central American and Caribbean Games - silver medal
1987 World Championships - bronze medal
1987 Pan American Games - gold medal
1986 Central American and Caribbean Games - gold medal
1985 Central American and Caribbean Championships - gold medal
1985 Central American and Caribbean Championships - silver medal (shot put)
1985 Universiade - gold medal
1983 World Championships - silver medal
1983 Pan American Games - gold medal
1983 Pan American Games - silver medal (shot put)
1983 Universiade - gold medal
1982 Central American and Caribbean Games - gold medal
1982 Central American and Caribbean Games - gold medal (shot put)
1981 Central American and Caribbean Championships - gold medal
1981 Central American and Caribbean Championships - gold medal (shot put)
1980 Summer Olympics - bronze medal
1979 Pan American Games - bronze medal
1978 Central American and Caribbean Games - gold medal
1977 Central American and Caribbean Championships - silver medal

See also
List of sportspeople sanctioned for doping offences

References
General
 
Specific

External links



1957 births
Living people
Cuban male discus throwers
Cuban male shot putters
Olympic athletes of Cuba
Olympic bronze medalists for Cuba
Athletes (track and field) at the 1980 Summer Olympics
Athletes (track and field) at the 1979 Pan American Games
Athletes (track and field) at the 1983 Pan American Games
Athletes (track and field) at the 1987 Pan American Games
Doping cases in athletics
Cuban sportspeople in doping cases
Sportspeople from Guantánamo
World Athletics Championships medalists
Medalists at the 1980 Summer Olympics
Pan American Games gold medalists for Cuba
Olympic bronze medalists in athletics (track and field)
Pan American Games medalists in athletics (track and field)
Universiade medalists in athletics (track and field)
World Athletics Championships athletes for Cuba
Central American and Caribbean Games gold medalists for Cuba
Competitors at the 1978 Central American and Caribbean Games
Competitors at the 1982 Central American and Caribbean Games
Competitors at the 1986 Central American and Caribbean Games
Competitors at the 1993 Central American and Caribbean Games
Universiade gold medalists for Cuba
Central American and Caribbean Games medalists in athletics
Medalists at the 1983 Summer Universiade
Medalists at the 1985 Summer Universiade
Medalists at the 1979 Pan American Games
Medalists at the 1983 Pan American Games
Medalists at the 1987 Pan American Games
20th-century Cuban people